The 55th edition of the World Allround Speed Skating Championships for Women took place on 5 and 6 February 1994 in Butte at the High Mountain Altitude Rink.

Title holder was Gunda Kleemann from Germany.

Distance medalists

Classification

 * = Fell

Source:

References

Attribution
In Dutch

1990s in speed skating
1990s in women's speed skating
1994 World Allround
1994 in women's speed skating